Michel Guerry (born 2 December 1932) is a French politician and a former member of the Senate of France. He is a member of the Union for a Popular Movement Party.

References
Page on the Senate website 

1932 births
Living people
French Senators of the Fifth Republic
Union for a Popular Movement politicians
Senators of French citizens living abroad
Place of birth missing (living people)